Autumn Affair is an Australian television series made by and aired by Network Seven station ATN-7, and also shown in Melbourne on Nine Network station GTV-9. Television in Australia had only been broadcasting since 1956 and Seven was the first commercial station to make drama a priority. It premiered 24 October 1958 and continued until 1959. The series was the first ever Australian television soap opera. It was also the second regular Australian-produced dramatic television series of any kind, with previous locally produced drama consisting of religious series The House on the Corner, and one-off plays largely aired on ABC.

Synopsis
The love lives of a middle aged widow, Julia, and her daughter, Meg.

Cast

Muriel Steinbeck as Julia Parrish
Queenie Ashton as Granny Bishop
Leonard Bullen as Steve Meadows
Janette Craig as Meg Parrish
John Juson as Mark
Diana Perryman as Julie
Owen Weingott as Larry Muir

Production
The program was conceived from a conversation between radio writer Richard Lane and Len Mauger, station manager of Seven. There was a quarter hour gap in the schedule and Mauger was keen to develop use of video tape for drama. It was decided to make a 15-minute show using skills developed by those involved in The House on the Corner.

Originally conceived as Julia: An Early Autumn Affair, the title was later shortened to just Autumn Affair.

Many of the actors and writers involved in the production had previously worked on radio soap opera, and were inexperienced with television acting.

Episodes were fifteen minutes in duration, recorded as kinescopes in black and white, and were screened Mondays, Tuesdays and Wednesdays at 8:45 AM. a part of the station's Today breakfast program.

There were three main conditions for the production:
it had to be written, produced and acted by Australians
it had to stand on its own as entertainment and compare with American imports
it had to be sold to other stations at comparable rates to the American imports.

The series went into production without a sponsor, as the station ATN7 wanted to gain experience in television drama production.

The cast comprised just six regulars; the story focused on Julia (Muriel Steinbeck), a widow in a love triangle situation with two men.

Filmink later wrote that "Steinbeck was... a natural choice to play the lead... She laughed, loved and suffered with jolly good decency – the quintessential Muriel Steinbeck part." Ailsa McPherson, who worked on the show as script assistant, wrote "for performance quality Autumn Affair relied heavily on Muriel Steinbeck's professionalism and her photographic memory. She had a prodigious capacity to remember lines and to be almost word perfect after reading them aloud only three or so times. It saved the episode on a good many occasions."

The series was well-received when originally broadcast.

Richard Lane wrote every episode. There were only two main sets and a could of small side pieces. Actors also would leave the series - Janette Craig accepted the role of Bubba in Summer of the Seventeenth Doll and had to be written out.

David Cahill left the show after directing 72 episodes. He was replaced by Ken Hannam. The series ended in 1959 after 156 episodes.

In a 1960 article in Sydney Morning Herald, it was noted that although mistakes were made during the production of the series due to inexperience, it nevertheless paved the way for improved locally produced drama productions.

Actors who appeared in the show included Muriel Steinbeck, Queenie Ashton, Diana Perryman (MBE (died 1979)(the sister of actress and singer Jill Perryman), Janet Craig, Leonard Bullen and Owen Weingott.

Cast members Queenie Ashton and Janette Craig had previously appeared in a 1957 ABC TV play together called Tomorrow's Child, though it is not known if a copy of the production still exists.

Every episode except for two of this series are held by the National Film and Sound Archive.

Later screenings
In 1964 HSV-7 Melbourne repeated the series, along with early 1960s Australian soap opera The Story of Peter Grey. In 1964 CTC-7 in Canberra screened the series along with Peter Grey, the station having not been in operation during the original run of the series. CTC kept the repeats on their schedule into 1966.

See also
Shell Presents – 1959–1960 series of one-off plays produced for Australian television
Emergency – Short-lived 1959 Australian medical drama
List of television plays broadcast on ATN-7
List of live television plays broadcast on Australian Broadcasting Corporation (1950s)

References

External links
 
 Autumn Affair at the National Film and Sound Archive

Seven Network original programming
Nine Network original programming
Australian television soap operas
1958 Australian television series debuts
1959 Australian television series endings
Black-and-white Australian television shows
English-language television shows
Television shows set in Sydney
Television shows set in Melbourne